In organic chemistry, diazines are a group of organic compounds having the molecular formula . Each contains a benzene ring in which two of the C-H fragments have been replaced by isolobal nitrogen.  There are three structural isomers:
 pyridazine (1,2-diazine) 
 pyrimidine (1,3-diazine) 
 pyrazine (1,4-diazine)

See also
 6-membered rings with one nitrogen atom: pyridines
 6-membered rings with three nitrogen atoms: triazines
 6-membered rings with four nitrogen atoms: tetrazines
 6-membered rings with five nitrogen atoms: pentazines
 6-membered rings with six nitrogen atoms: hexazines

References

 
Simple aromatic rings